is a Japanese former football player.

Club statistics

References

External links

1985 births
Living people
Ryutsu Keizai University alumni
Association football people from Kumamoto Prefecture
Japanese footballers
J2 League players
Japan Football League players
Roasso Kumamoto players
V-Varen Nagasaki players
Renofa Yamaguchi FC players
Association football midfielders